Waipa may refer to:

New Zealand
 Waipa (New Zealand electorate), a former electorate
 Waipa District, a territorial local authority
 Waipā River, a waterway

Elsewhere
 World Association of Investment Promotion Agencies, using the acronym WAIPA
 Waipa Foundation, non-profit organisation in Hawaii